Southend Club Cricket Stadium (previously known as the Defence Cricket Stadium) is a cricket ground in Karachi, Sindh, Pakistan.

It has hosted only one Test match, that being the 1st Test between Pakistan and Zimbabwe, from 1 December to 6 December 1993. Pakistan won by 131 runs, mainly due to Waqar Younis taking 7–91 in the first innings and 6–44 in the second. This was his first match as captain of Pakistan, standing in for Wasim Akram. Younis became Pakistan's youngest Test captain. It remains an approved venue for Test cricket.

The stadium has hosted 17 other first-class cricket matches from 1990 to 2000, and 16 List A limited overs matches from 1990 to 1999.

Defence Housing Authority Stadium since 2005 has now developed into The Southend Club with various sports & recreationals facilities.

In January 2019, the venue was named as the host of the Women's Twenty20 International (WT20I) series between the Pakistan and West Indies women's cricket teams.

Recently, ACC Emerging Teams Asia Cup matches were held at the Southend Club

In the past, Sri Lanka, England 'A' Team, West Indies under-19 team and Bangladesh Men and Women teams also played their matches at this Stadium.

List of five-wicket hauls

Tests
Two five wicket hauls in Test matches have been taken at the venue.

References

External links
 Pakistan ground profiles – Defence Housing Authority Stadium, from Cricinfo.com
 Ground Profile CricketArchive

Defence, Karachi
Test cricket grounds in Pakistan
Stadiums in Karachi
Cricket grounds in Pakistan
Cricket in Karachi